Vin Moore (January 23, 1879 – December 5, 1949) was an American film director, actor and writer. He directed 83 films between 1915 and 1938. He was born in Mayville, New York, and died in Hollywood, California.

Selected filmography
 Captain Kidd, Jr. (1919)
 Distilled Love (1920)
 Lazy Lightning (1926)
 The Man from the West (1926)
 See America Thirst (1930)
 Many a Slip (1931)
Flirting with Danger (1934)
 Love Past Thirty (1934)
 Cheers of the Crowd (1935)
 The Drag-Net (1936)
 Topa Topa (1938)

References

External links

1879 births
1949 deaths
American male film actors
American male screenwriters
Male actors from New York (state)
People from Mayville, New York
20th-century American male actors
Film directors from New York (state)
Screenwriters from New York (state)
20th-century American male writers
20th-century American screenwriters